The 2019 CBR Brave season was the Brave's 6th season in the Australian Ice Hockey League since being founded and entering the league in 2014. The season ran from 20 April 2019 to 31 August 2019 for the Brave. CBR finished first in the regular season to clinch the H Newman Reid Trophy for the second time in franchise history. However, the Brave lost their semi-final match to the Sydney Bears during the Goodall Cup Finals series in Newcastle. The team set a number of new league records including: most wins (26), most points (79), largest winning streak (17 matches), most goals scored (161), fewest goals conceded in a 28 match season (67) and least losses in a 28 match season (2).

Roster

Team roster for the 2019 AIHL season

Notes:

Transfers

In

Out

Staff

Staff Roster for 2019 AIHL season

Standings

Regular season

Summary

Position by round

League table

Source

Finals

Summary

Bracket

Schedule & results

Regular season

Finals
Goodall Cup semi-final

Player statistics

Skaters

Goaltenders

Awards

References

CBR Brave seasons